Mark Frye (born 1957) is a two-time Emmy Award winning musician and composer. He was signed to Virgin Records in 1996. He is also the great-grandson of West Virginia politician J. S. Pridemore.
Frye is part of the long-lived nostalgia rock group, Phil Dirt and the Dozers. His work as a commercial musician is extensive, including scoring for advertising, television, and film. Frye is most known for his long-term collaboration with Jack Hanna, having scored the majority of Hanna's wildlife documentary projects.

References

1957 births
American male composers
21st-century American composers
Emmy Award winners
Living people
21st-century American male musicians